Saleh bin Nasser Al-Jasser is Saudi Arabia's Minister of transport, appointed by a royal decree on 23 October 2019.

Education and Career 
Al-Jasser holds a bachelor's degree from King Abdul Aziz University in Jeddah in industrial engineering. He also obtained both a master's degree and  MBA from King Saud University in Riyadh. Al-Jasser served as the director-general of Saudi Arabian Airlines from August 2014 to October 2019. He also was Chief Executive Officer of National Shipping Co of Saudi Arabia from November 2010 to June 2014. Previously, he served as a board member and chairman in several positions including Saudi Research and Marketing Group, Arabia Insurance Cooperative, Etihad Etisalat Co, Saudi Airlines Catering Co, and Saudia Aerospace Engineering Industries.

See also 
 Council of Ministers of Saudi Arabia
 Ministry of Transport (Saudi Arabia)

References

Saleh
Saleh
Saleh
Living people
Saleh
Saleh
Saleh
Date of birth missing (living people)
Place of birth missing (living people)
Year of birth missing (living people)